The Asbestos Aztèques were a Canadian minor pro ice hockey team in Asbestos, Quebec. They played in the Quebec Semi-Pro Hockey League from 1997 to 2003.

They were named the Aztèques from 1997 to 2000, and from 2002 to 2003, and the Dubé from 2000 to 2002.

External links
 The Internet Hockey Database

Val-des-Sources
Ice hockey teams in Quebec
Ice hockey clubs established in 1997
Ice hockey clubs disestablished in 2003
Quebec Semi-Pro Hockey League teams
1997 establishments in Quebec
2003 disestablishments in Quebec